The Korea Open is an annual table tennis tournament in South Korea. It is organised by the Korea Table Tennis Association, under the authority of the International Table Tennis Federation (ITTF), and is currently one of six top-tier Platinum events on the ITTF World Tour.

History

The tournament was first held in 1980, and has featured on the ITTF World Tour's schedule (former ITTF Pro Tour) every year since 2001.

China's Xu Xin currently holds the record for most men's singles tournament wins, with four, while Singapore's Feng Tianwei holds the record for most women's singles tournament wins, also with three.

Champions

1980–2017

) was called Seoul Open
) was the final tournament of the Grand Prix series, called Seoul Grand Prix

2018–present

See also
Asian Table Tennis Union

References

External links
International Table Tennis Federation
Korean Table Tennis Association (in Korean)

ITTF World Tour
Table tennis competitions
Table tennis competitions in South Korea
Recurring sporting events established in 1985
1985 establishments in South Korea